Knema pachycarpa is a species of plant in the family Myristicaceae. It is endemic to Vietnam.

References

pachycarpa
Endemic flora of Vietnam
Trees of Vietnam
Vulnerable plants
Taxonomy articles created by Polbot